Bollate Centro railway station is a railway station in Italy. Located in the Milan–Saronno railway, it serves the centre of the town of Bollate. The station is located at Piazza Carlo Marx. The ancient station of 1879 was demolished in 1992, when the actual building was opened.

Services 
The station is served by lines S1 and S3 of the Milan suburban railway service, operated by the Lombard railway company Trenord.

See also 
 Milan suburban railway service

References

External links 
 Ferrovienord official site - Bollate Centro railway station 

Railway stations in Lombardy
Ferrovienord stations
Milan S Lines stations
Bollate